Stigmella rubeta is a moth of the family Nepticulidae. It is found in tropical montane forest of the western slopes of the Andes in Ecuador.

The wingspan is about 4.5 mm. Adults have been found from February to early March.

The larvae feed on Rubus species. They mine the leaves of their host plant. The mine is usually located between two leaf veins. It starts as a long and very narrow gallery with blackish or black frass, deposited in a broken, slender central line. Later the gallery widens sometimes becoming very contorted and resembling a blotch. Here, the frass is blackish or brown and deposited in a broad irregular central line.

External links
New Neotropical Nepticulidae (Lepidoptera) from the western Amazonian rainforest and the Andes of Ecuador

Nepticulidae
Moths of South America
Moths described in 2002